Mojo Motors, Inc. was an American automotive classified website for preowned automobiles.

Founder Paul Nadjarian was a Ford Motor Company and eBay Motors executive before starting Mojo Motors, Inc. in 2011. The startup aggregates used cars from dealerships in a geographic area that offer discount pricing and then alerts shoppers when the price of the vehicle they are following drops in price.

In 2012, the company secured nearly $5 million in funding from venture firms Atlas Venture, RPM Ventures and NextView Ventures to expand nationwide.

References

Further reading

External links
 Official website

Online automotive companies of the United States
Marketing companies established in 2011
Internet properties established in 2011
Online advertising services and affiliate networks